We Weren't Married in Church is a 1982 Soviet drama romance directed by Boris Tokarev.

Plot 
The film tells about the daughter of a clergyman who fictitiously marries a revolutionary. Over time, a real love arises between them, but suddenly he is sent to hard labor.

Cast 
 Aleksandr Galibin
 Natalya Vavilova
 Pyotr Velyaminov
 Lyudmila Gladunko
 Aleksey Zharkov
 Galina Polskikh
 Rita Gladunko
 Anatoliy Solovyov	
 Boris Bachurin
 Dmitri Popov

References

External links 
 

1982 films
1980s Russian-language films
Soviet romance films
1980s romance films